Redstone Lake may refer to one of two lakes in Ontario, Canada:
Redstone Lake (Haliburton County), in Haliburton County
Redstone Lake (Sudbury District), in Sudbury District